D201 is a state road connecting D44 state road in Buzet to Požane border crossing to Slovenia.

The road, as well as all other state roads in Croatia, is managed and maintained by Hrvatske ceste, state owned company.

Traffic volume 

Traffic is regularly counted and reported by Hrvatske ceste, operator of the road. Substantial variations between annual (AADT) and summer (ASDT) traffic volumes are attributed to the fact that the road carries substantial tourist traffic to Istria.

Road junctions and populated areas

Sources

State roads in Croatia
Transport in Istria County